The Prix des cinq continents de la francophonie (literally "Prize of the five continents of the francophonie") is a literary prize created in 2001 by the Organisation internationale de la francophonie.

Winners

References 

French-language literary awards
Organisation internationale de la Francophonie
Awards established in 2001